Gourmohan Sachin Mondal Mahavidyalaya, established in 1969, is an undergraduate college in Bireshwarpur, South 24 Parganas, West Bengal, India. It is affiliated with the University of Calcutta.

Departments

Science

Chemistry
Physics
Mathematics
Botany
Zoology

Arts and Commerce

Bengali
English
Sanskrit
History
Geography
Political Science
Philosophy
Economics
Education
Commerce

Accreditation
Gourmohan Sachin Mondal Mahavidyalaya is recognized by the University Grants Commission (UGC).

See also 
List of colleges affiliated to the University of Calcutta
Education in India
Education in West Bengal

References

External links
Gourmohan Sachin Mondal Mahavidyalaya

Educational institutions established in 1969
University of Calcutta affiliates
Universities and colleges in South 24 Parganas district
1969 establishments in West Bengal